Spathopria is an extinct genus of wasp currently comprising a single species Spathopria sayrevillensis.

References

Taxa named by Michael S. Engel